The 2019–20 BBL season was the 43rd season for the London Lions in the BBL, and the 8th under the banner of London Lions.

The club won its first regular season title with a 99–80 victory over the Newcastle Eagles at the Eagles Community Arena on April 26, 2019.

The London Lions played their home games at the 7,000 seat Copper Box Arena in Queen Elizabeth Olympic Park, London.

Following a strong 2018-19 season where the Lions finished 27-6, they had many players depart the club such as Kervin Bristol, Ladarius Tabb, Jordan Spencer and Dzaflo Larkai.

In the 2019-20 season the Lions quickly resigned two-time BBL MVP Justin Robinson, Andre Lockhart and Lions captain Joe Ikhinmwin with the return of American forward Brandon Peel.

The Lions made one of the biggest signings in the BBL history and signed Ovie Soko to start at the small-forward position, along with new signings of Spanish guard Jorge Romero, Jordan Whelan from Worcester Wolves, Americans Dii’Jon Allen-Jordan from Cheshire Phoenix and Jordan Jackson.

The Lions also, signed Jules Dang-Akodo and Samuel Toluwase from the inaugural London City Royals team from the 2018–19 BBL season. Lions later signed French big man Alioune Tew at the center position.

On December 13, 2019, the Lions announced that the Club and guard/forward Dii’Jon Allen-Jordan have “mutually” agreed to part ways. With the departure of Allen-Jordan the Lions signed promising Ethiopian/American forward Buay Tuach on January, 10th, 2020. On January 17, 2020, the Lions signed British point guard Ogo Adegboye to replace Spanish guard Jorge Romero.

With the withdrawal of the London City Royals, Edmir Lucas signed with the London Lions to replace Ogo Adegboye on February 12, 2020, for the remainder of the 2019–20 BBL season. On February 14, 2020, Lucas scored 8 points in 14 minutes of action in a 66-75 away win against the Bristol Flyers in only his second game with the team.

On 17 March 2020, the season was postponed due to the COVID-19 pandemic in the United Kingdom. On 1 June 2020, the season was cancelled, with no League or Playoffs champions declared.

Roster

Depth chart

Cup
The newly-formatted BBL Cup will begin the 2019–20 season on Friday 20 September, with the group stages running until Sunday 24 November. The 12 teams have been split into 2 geographical groups, North and South. Each team will play each other twice (once home, once away) with the top 4 teams in each group progressing to the Quarter Finals. Single-legged quarter finals and two-legged semi finals matches will determine the two finalists who will contest the Cup Final on Sunday 26 January at the Arena Birmingham.

South Group

Game log 

|- style="background-color:#ffcccc;"
| 1
| September 20
| @ Worcester Wolves
| L 92–67
| Brandon Peel (30)
| Brandon Peel (15)
| Lockhart, Robinson (4)
| Worcester Arena
| 0–1
|- style="background-color:#ffcccc;"
| 2
| October 5
| @ London City Royals
| L 92–77
| Brandon Peel (19)
| Brandon Peel (13)
| Justin Robinson (7)
| Crystal Palace National Sports Centre
| 0–2
|- style="background-color:#ffcccc;"
| 3
| October 19
| @ Bristol Flyers
| L 97–94
| Brandon Peel (35)
| Brandon Peel (7)
| Justin Robinson (7)
| SGS College Arena
| 0–3
|- style="background-color:#ccffcc;"
| 4
| October 23
| Plymouth Raiders
| W 101–86
| Dang-Akodo, Robinson (17)
| Allen-Jordan, Peel (9)
| Justin Robinson (7)
| Copper Box Arena
| 1–3
|- style="background-color:#ffcccc;"
| 5
| October 26
| @ Surrey Scorchers
| L 80–77
| Brandon Peel (25)
| Brandon Peel (14)
| Justin Robinson (6)
| Surrey Sports Park
| 1–4
|- style="background-color:#ccffcc;"
| 6
| November 1
| London City Royals
| W 100–99
| Justin Robinson (23)
| Brandon Peel (11)
| Justin Robinson (10)
| Copper Box Arena
| 2–4
|- style="background-color:#ccffcc;"
| 7
| November 3
| @ Plymouth Raiders
| W 80–90
| Brandon Peel (23)
| Brandon Peel (11)
| Jorge Romero (5)
| Plymouth Pavilions
| 3–4
|- style="background-color:#ffcccc;"
| 8
| November 8
| Worcester Wolves
| L 85–90
| Dii’Jon Allen-Jordan (31)
| Jorge Romero (7)
| Jorge Romero (4)
| University of East London
| 3–5
|- style="background-color:#ccffcc;"
| 9
| November 20
| Bristol Flyers
| W 103–69
| Brandon Peel (27)
| Brandon Peel (12)
| Jorge Romero (4)
| Copper Box Arena
| 4–5
|- style="background-color:#ccffcc;"
| 10
| November 23
| Surrey Scorchers
| W 98–87
| Brandon Peel (25)
| Brandon Peel (11)
| Justin Robinson (8)
| Copper Box Arena
| 5–5

|- style="background-color:#ffcccc;"
| 11
| November 29
| @ Leicester Riders
| L 72–63
| Brandon Peel (23)
| Alioune Tew (9)
| Justin Robinson (2)
| Morningside Arena
| 5–6
|-

Trophy
The BBL Trophy retains the same format as introduced in 2018–19. The 12 BBL teams are joined in the first round draw by 4 invited teams; Solent Kestrels and Worthing Thunder from the English Basketball League, Dunfermline Reign from the Scottish Basketball Championship and Basketball Wales. There is an open draw to form a bracket, mapping out each team's path to the final which will be held, for the 8th consecutive year, at the Emirates Arena in Glasgow.

Game log 

|- style="background-color:#ffcccc;"
| 1
| January 4
| Solent Kestrels
| L 82-92
| Justin Robinson (19)
| Brandon Peel (8)
| Dang Akodo, Robinson (4)
| University of East London
| 0-1
|-

Championship

Ladder 

The BBL Championship will run from Friday 6 December – Sunday 19 April. All 12 teams will play each other twice, once home once away, for a 22-game regular season. The top 8 teams will qualify for the end of season Playoffs. London City Royals withdrew from the league, and their 1–3 record was expunged.

On 17 March 2020, the season was postponed due to the COVID-19 pandemic in the United Kingdom. On 1 June 2020, the season was cancelled, with no League or Playoffs champions declared.

Regular-season standings

Game log 

|- style="background-color:#ccffcc;"
| 1
| December 8
| Glasgow Rocks
| W 88-72
| Brandon Peel (18)
| Ovie Soko (13)
| Jorge Romero (4)
| Copper Box Arena
| 1-0
|- style="background-color:#ccffcc;"
| 2
| December 15
| @ Manchester Giants
| W 73-103
| Justin Robinson (17)
| Brandon Peel (8)
| Dang-Akodo, Robinson (5)
| George H. Carnall Sports Centre
| 2-0
|- style="background-color:#ccffcc;"
| 3
| December 18
| Bristol Flyers
| W 99-88
| Ovie Soko (22)
| Peel, Soko (7)
| Lockhart, Robinson (4)
| Copper Box Arena
| 3-0
|- style="background-color:#ccffcc;"
| 4
| December 22
| Sheffield Sharks
| W 87-79
| Ovie Soko (17)
| Alioune Tew (10)
| Justin Robinson (6)
| Copper Box Arena
| 4-0
|- style="background-color:#ffcccc;"
| 5
| December 27
| @ Worcester Wolves
| L 80-78
| Peel, Robinson (18)
| Brandon Peel (14)
| Justin Robinson (5)
| Worcester Arena
| 4-1

|- style="background-color:#ccffcc;"
| 6
| January 10
| @ Plymouth Raiders
| W 82-91
| Ovie Soko (21)
| Brandon Peel (12)
| Justin Robinson (7)
| Plymouth Pavilions
| 5-1
|- style="background-color:#ccffcc;"
| 7
| January 17
| Surrey Scorchers
| W 107-98
| Ovie Soko (27)
| Buay Tuach (9)
| Justin Robinson (6)
| Copper Box Arena
| 6-1
|- style="background-color:#ccffcc;"
| 8
| January 19
| @ Sheffield Sharks
| W 86-91
| Justin Robinson (27)
| Ovie Soko (11)
| Ikhinmwin, Robinson (3)
| Ponds Forge
| 7-1
|- style="background-color:#ffcccc;"
| 9
| January 31
| @ Leicester Riders
| L 83-76
| Ovie Soko (21)
| Ovie Soko (9)
| Dang-Akodo, Robinson, Soko, Whelan  (3)
| Morningside Arena
| 7-2

|- style="background-color:#ffcccc;"
| 10
| February 7
| @ Newcastle Eagles
| L 108-97
| Ovie Soko (33)
| Buay Tuach (10)
| Lockhart, Robinson (6)
| Eagles Community Arena
| 7-3
|- style="background-color:#ccffcc;"
| 11
| February 12
| Cheshire Phoenix
| W 94-78
| Justin Robinson (19)
| Joe Ikhinmwin (8)
| Justin Robinson (6)
| Copper Box Arena
| 8-3
|- style="background-color:#ccffcc;"
| 12
| February 14
| @ Bristol Flyers
| W 66-75
| Peel, Robinson (14)
| Alioune Tew (11)
| Dang-Akodo, Robinson (5)
| SGS College Arena
| 9-3

|- style="background-color:#ccffcc;"
| 13
| March 1
| Leicester Riders
| W 99-65
| Brandon Peel (23)
| Brandon Peel (13)
| Justin Robinson (6)
| Copper Box Arena
| 10-3
|- style="background-color:#ffcccc;"
| 14
| March 7
| @ Surrey Scorchers
| L 101-95
| Ovie Soko (25)
| Peel, Soko (12)
| Peel, Soko, Tuach (3)
| Surrey Sports Park
| 10-4

|- style="background-color:;"
| 15
| April 1
| Newcastle Eagles
| boxscore
| N/A
| N/A
| N/A
| Copper Box Arena
| N/A
|- styN/Ale="background-color:;"
| 16
| April 4
| Worcester Wolves
| boxscore
| N/A
| N/A
| N/A
| Copper Box Arena
| N/A
|- style="background-color:;"
| 17
| April 5
| @ Cheshire Phoenix
| boxscore
| N/A
| N/A
| N/A
| Cheshire Oaks Arena
| N/A
|- style="background-color:;"
| 18
| April 8
| Manchester Giants
| boxscore
| N/A
| N/A
| N/A
| Copper Box Arena
| N/A
|- style="background-color:;"
| 19
| April 12
| @ Glasgow Rocks
| boxscore
| N/A
| N/A
| N/A
| Emirates Arena
| N/A
|- style="background-color:;"
| 20
| April 17
| Plymouth Raiders
| boxscore
| N/A
| N/A
| N/A
| Copper Box Arena
| N/A
|-

Player statistics

BBL Championship statistics

BBL Cup statistics

See also 

 2019–20 British Basketball League season
 London Lions

Notes

References

External links 
 

London Lions
2019–20 in British basketball
2019–20 in European basketball by club